Naan Mirugamaai Maara is a 2022 Tamil-language action thriller film written and directed by Sathyasiva and produced by T. D. Rajha and D. R. Sanjay Kumar under the banner of Chendur Film International. The film stars M. Sasikumar, Hariprriya and Vikranth in lead roles. It has no songs with a score composed by Ghibran, with cinematography by Raja Bhattacharjee and editing by N. B. Srikanth. Originally titled Common Man, the title was changed to Naan Mirugamaai Maara after a legal dispute.

This is the second collaboration of Sasikumar and producer T. D. Rajha after the 2021 film Raajavamsam and Sasikumar's first collaboration with Sathyasiva. The film was predominantly shot in Chennai.

It was planned to release in theatres in October 2022, but was postponed due to post-production delays. It was released theatrically on 18 November 2022.

Plot
Bhoominathan is a family man. He is married and leads a peaceful life. But, things take a turn when his brother is killed. To take revenge for his brother's death, Bhoomi approaches some hitmen. But he doesn't know that he will get caught on the web. He is seriously threatened and Bhoomi doesn't know how to save his family from the villain.

Cast

Production

Development 
The film was tentatively titled as Sasikumar21. On 25 July 2022, the film's official title was unveiled as Naan Mirugamaai Maara.

Casting 
Sasikumar plays the role of sound engineer in this film. Actress Hariprriya was chosen as the female lead in this film marking the first collaboration with Sasikumar. Actor Vikranth portrays the main antagonist.

Music
The film score was composed by Ghibran.The film has no songs. The audio rights were acquired by Think Music India.

Release

Theatrical
The film was initially scheduled to release in theatres in October 2022, but was postponed to 18 November 2022. The trailer of the film were released on 29 October 2022.

Distribution
The distribution rights of the film in Tamil Nadu were acquired by Sangili Murugan under the banner of Murugan Cine Arts. The distribution rights of the film in Karnataka were acquired by ATM Productions.

Home Media
The post-theatrical television satellite rights were sold to Sun TV and the digital rights to Sun NXT.The film was telecast through Sun TV on 5 February 2023.

Reception
Logesh Balachandran of The Times of India who gave 2 stars out of 5 stars after reviewing the film stated that,"Naan Mirugamai Maara would have been better if the director had made this film a decade ago". Avinash Ramachandran of Cinema Express who gave 2.5 stars out of stars after reviewing the film stated that,"It is quite a shame because Naan Mirugamaai Maara could have been cut out of the same cloth as a John Wick or a Nobody, but the overt sentimentality and emotional prodding make it a rather middling experience". G. Gowtham of India Herald, wrote "Overall, Satya Siva has written a compelling plot that keeps us interested. Although there are sentiments, this may not be an option for family audiences, and it may be a takeaway for gory violent action film fans".

References

External links
 

2020s Tamil-language films
Indian action thriller films